Rooftop Prince is a 2012 South Korean fantasy romantic comedy television drama, starring Park Yoo-chun, Han Ji-min, Jeong Yu-mi, Lee Tae-sung, Lee Tae-ri, Jung Suk-won, and Choi Woo-shik. It is about a Joseon crown prince who, after his wife dies mysteriously, time travels to the future where he encounters familiar faces, modern-day devices, and corporate intrigue. The series aired on SBS from March 21 to May 24, 2012 on Wednesdays and Thursdays at 21:55 for 20 episodes. It is available on Netflix.

Synopsis
Yong Tae-mu (Lee Tae-sung), after killing his lost cousin in the United States, returns to Korea, claiming that his cousin, Yong Tae-yong (Park Yoochun), could not be found in New York City. Meanwhile, Tae-mu has been having a secret affair with Hong Se-na (Jeong Yu-mi), his secretary, who, in turn, runs into her long-lost stepsister Park-ha (Han Ji-min). Park-ha has been missing for a prolonged period of time and it is revealed that she was in the US after Se-na abandoned her in a truck driving away when she was nine.

Two years after Tae-yong's disappearance, four men dressed in Joseon-era garments fall onto Park-ha's rooftop house. Hungry, homeless and having nowhere to go, the four men decide to stick with Park-ha. Their leader, Lee-gak claims to be the Crown Prince of Joseon (Park Yoochun), along with his entourage – scholar Song Man-bo (Lee Tae-ri), personal bodyguard Woo Yong-sool (Jung Suk-won), and palace eunuch Do Chi-san (Choi Woo-shik). One day, Crown Prince Lee Gak sees Se-na who is the spitting image of his beloved wife, who was found drowned in the 18th century. He is convinced she is his wife's reincarnation. Meanwhile, Yeo (Ban Hyo-jung), a wealthy president of a large company, mistakes Lee Gak for her grandson, Yong Tae-yong, because of their exact same appearance, and believes that her long lost grandson has finally returned. Lee Gak realizes that he has time traveled 300 years to 2012, Seoul, to search for the truth behind the mysterious death of the late Crown Princess. In order to approach Se-na, who is also President Yeo's personal assistant, Lee Gak pretends that he is Tae-yong. Tae-mu, believing that he already killed his cousin in New York, lives in constant fear of his devious act being discovered by the family and "Tae-yong" (aka Lee Gak) who claims not to have remembered the event. Tae-mu has always been jealous of Tae-yong's favored position in the family.

On the other hand, Park-ha is shocked by the news that her new friend who calls himself the Crown Prince is, in fact, the grandson of the CEO. But before long, her feelings for Lee Gak blossom and she is hurt when she finds out that Lee Gak, who still holds very tender memories of his dead wife, is courting Se-na. Lee Gak also believes that marrying Se-na in Seoul in the year 2012 would bring him closer to solving the mystery of the Crown Princess' murder in the Joseon era.

Cast

Main
Park Yoo-chun as Crown Prince Lee Gak / Yong Tae-yong 
Choi Won-hong as Young Lee Gak
He is the Crown Prince in the Joseon era. Intelligent, kind, wise, cautious and exercises good judgment though a little pompous and prone to think highly of himself (as expected of being part of the Royal Family), the Crown Prince finds himself time travelling 300 years into the future and confronts considerable challenges as he adapts to 21st-century Seoul and Park-ha. His modern era counterpart, Tae-yong, was left for dead by his cousin Tae-mu, after the latter pushed the former at the sea at the start of the episode. Lee Gak starts to impersonate as Tae-yong as he realizes that the Joseon era and the modern era holds similarities that will bring him closer to solve his wife's death. (Lee Gak in initial episodes wears a red tracksuit.)

Han Ji-min as Park-ha / Hong Bu-yong
Jeon Min-seo as Young Bu-yong / Young Park-ha
Strong, resilient and having an optimistic personality, Park-ha has endured many hardships and trials since she was separated from her family at age 9. She has been looking out for herself ever since. She helps Lee Gak and his entourage to live in the modern era after they appeared at her home. Her Joseon era counterpart, Bu-yong, is shy, elegant and smart younger sister of the Crown Princess Hwa-yong who harbors strong feelings towards the Crown Prince. She was to be the supposed betrothed of Lee Gak, until her face was burned by Hwa-yong and thus the prospect of being the Crown Princess was passed to her older sister and forced herself to wear a face mask to hide the scar on her cheek.

Jeong Yu-mi as Hong Se-na / Hong Hwa-yong
Kim So-hyun as Young Hwa-yong / Young Se-na
Se-na is Park-ha's  older stepsister. She works as the secretary at the company owned by Tae-yong and Tae-mu's grandmother. Ambitious, Evil, scheming, and hateful of Park-Ha, she has relied on Tae-mu in the past to advance herself. She is resentful of Park-ha and has made her sister's life difficult. As Hwa-yong, she is Lee Gak's wife, the Crown Princess, and Bu-yong's older sister.

Lee Tae-sung as Yong Tae-mu / Prince Muchang 	
Tae-yong's cousin and Se-na's secret lover. He holds a high position in the company and is not lacking in skills nor industry. Tae-yong's and Tae-mu's grandfather had a transgression with another woman, which resulted in the birth of Tae-mu's father (an illegitimate child).  Because there is no blood relation between Tae-yong's grandmother, who is also the CEO of the company, Tae-mu has always been sidestepped in favor of Tae-yong. Smart and ruthless, he resorts to whatever means necessary to get what he wants. His Joseon era counterpart (as revealed in the last episode), Prince Muchang, is Lee Gak's half-brother.

Lee Tae-ri as Song Man-bo
One of Lee Gak's entourage. A child prodigy, he has become proficient in all fields of study by age 22. However, because he is an illegitimate child, he cannot sit for any government exams and thus, cannot take a position as officer. Because of the hopelessness of his future prospects, he has abandoned the study of the classics for an immoral lifestyle until Crown Prince Lee Gak enlisted his help to solve the Crown Princess' murder. (In the initial episodes, he wears the green tracksuit.)

Jung Suk-won as Woo Yong-sool
One of Lee Gak's entourage. He murdered the nobleman who killed his mother and raped his sister, as well as the nobleman's guard of about 15 others. He is very skilled with the sword. When later questioned by Lee Gak, he said that he learned to fight in order to protect the innocent, his nation and his king. His intentions are true and the Crown Prince saved him from the executioner's axe and appointed him as his personal bodyguard. (In the initial episodes, he wears the blue tracksuit.)

Choi Woo-shik as Do Chi-san
One of Lee Gak's entourage. Smooth with the ladies and skilled with men, Chi-san works at the largest brothel in Joseon. From the palace to the bedroom, Chi-san is wise in the ways of the world. Lee Gak appointed him as palace eunuch to discover what the people are saying about the Crown Princess' murder. (In the initial episodes, he wears the yellow tracksuit.)

Supporting 
Kim Yu-seok as the King, Lee Gak's father
Kil Yong-woo as Lord Hong Man-pil, Bu-yong and Hwa-yong's father and Left State Minister of Joseon.
Kyeon Mi-ri as Lady Jeong, Bu-yong and Hwa-yong's mother.
Song Ok-sook as Gong Man-ok, Se-na's mother and Park-ha's stepmother.
Maeng Sang-hoon as Park In-cheol, Park-ha's father
Na Young-hee as President Jang Seon-joo, Park-ha's mother
Kim Hyung-bum as Officer Hong Nak-hyeon, Bu-yong and Hwa-yong's brother and head of the royal police
Kang Byul as Lady Mimi
Guzal Tursunova as Becky
Ban Hyo-jung as Chairman Yeo, chairman of the Home & Shopping Network, and Tae-yong's grandmother
Ahn Suk-hwan as Yong Dong-man, Tae-mu's father
Park Joon-geum as Yong Seol-hee, Dong-man's aunt
Lee Moon-sik as Pyo Taek-soo

Production

Prior to the script reading, the main actors were required to undertake a camera test dressed in traditional costumes. The first script reading occurred at the SBS Ilsan Production Center on February 1, 2012.

Filming for Rooftop Prince began on February 4, 2012. On February 7, 2012, a traditional wedding scene was filmed at Gyeonghui Palace in Seoul, involving the young Crown Prince Lee Gak and Hwa Yong.

Filming was temporarily rescheduled due to the passing of Park Yoochun's father on March 13, however Park resumed work on March 17 as the pilot episode was scheduled to air on the 21st.

Original soundtrack
To date, three EPs and one album have been released.

Rooftop Prince OST Part 1

Rooftop Prince OST Part 2

Rooftop Prince OST Vol. 1

Rooftop Prince OST Part 3

Ratings

Despite average ratings in South Korea, the drama was popular overseas, especially in China and Japan. Fans from 35 countries have visited the filming set.

Awards and nominations

Notes

References

External links
 Rooftop Prince official SBS website 

 

2012 South Korean television series debuts
2012 South Korean television series endings
Seoul Broadcasting System television dramas
Korean-language television shows
South Korean time travel television series
Television series set in the Joseon dynasty
Television shows set in South Korea
Television shows set in New York City
South Korean romantic comedy television series
South Korean fantasy television series